"Only One" is a song recorded by South Korean singer-songwriter BoA for her 2012 eponymous seventh studio album. Written and composed by BoA herself with additional arrangement by Kim Yong-shin and Kim Tae-seong, the pop and R&B track was released as the second single from Only One on July 22, 2012, to coincide with its parental album release. It was later re-recorded in Japanese, and released on February 27, 2013, as her 32nd Japanese single, before eventually included in Who's Back? (2014), her first Japanese full-length release in over four years.

On August 7, 2012, BoA stated in a fan meeting that she would be releasing the Japanese version of "Only One" in the winter of 2012–2013. She also announced that she would be translating the lyrics from Korean to Japanese herself, as she had written the original in Korean and composed the track herself. Official confirmation came on December 10, 2012, via Avex, that BoA would be releasing a new Japanese single. Reports also alluded to a new music video for the Japanese version of "Only One". A month later, the jackets for both the CD and CD+DVD versions were revealed via her official website.

Music video
The Japanese version of "Only One" has a different music video from the original Korean version, although the choreography is the same. It also includes a scene with BoA singing on the set featured on the cover.

For the Korean version, two versions of the music video are released. The Dance version was released on July 22, 2012 while the Drama version was released 3 days later.

Versions
There are five different versions of this release: 
 CD only
 CD+DVD
 USB Version A 
 USB Version B
 iTunes

The CD+DVD version comes in a larger package and includes music videos and a "making of" video for both songs.

The USB versions use two different designs, and are limited to SOUL (BoA's fanbase in Japan). The USB contains the audio track in 48 kHz 24bit .wav file format and has 4GB capacity.

Additional products
There were additional products available:
 "Only One: Dance Version" DVD: Available for those who purchased both the first edition of the CD and the CD+DVD in one purchase.
 "Only One" letter set: Available to SOUL members who bought the CD+DVD, USB version A, and USB version B in one purchase. The letter set included clear files (all 3 types), writing paper, and a ball-point pen.
 Clear file: Available to SOUL members who bought one of four available formats (excluding the iTunes version).

Promotion
On the day of the jacket release, a preview of the Japanese version of "Only One" was released via QR code. The code was distributed floating on the surface of a coffee or a cocktail, redirecting the scanner to BoA featuring the Only One Cocktail website. Incorporating a QR code onto a drink's surface was an international first. The QR code was made of natural food. The website also hosted astrological predictions and a contest. According to Oricon, the campaign commenced in November 2012 with trials in five Tokyo cafes, but only the instrumental version of the song was available prior to January 2013. Two more cafes later ran the promotion in February 2013.

The seven cafes were:
 ライオンのいるサーカス (Ebisu)
 ビッフィ カフェ (Shibuya)
 café LUCE (Azabujuban)
 76CAFE omotesando (Omotesando)
 knot (Omotesando)
 Sign 代官山 (Daikanyama)
 Sign 外苑前 (Gaienmae)

BoA also left a promotional message video on the Only One Cocktail website: "Hi everyone I'm BoA. The song that's streaming on this site is actually my new song 'Only One.' This song is a song about separation, as though you are visualizing scenes of separation in more  as the lyrics progress. As I think people who have experienced such separation even only for once before will certainly be able to sympathize with the contents of the lyrics and the tune is really easy to remember, everybody please listen to it repeatedly."

"Only One" was used as the ending theme song for the TV program Takeshi no Nippon no Mikata and as the commercial song for music.jp.

Accolades

Media promotions

TV appearances
 February 15, 2013: Space Shower TV: Space Shower Countdown
 February 24: NHK: Music Japan
 February 27: NTV: No.1 Song Show
 February 27: NTV: Hirunan!
 March 1: NTV: Happy Music
 March 1: NTV: Hot@Asia
 March 1: Fuji TV: Mezamashi TV

Radio
 February 26: J-Wave: Groove Line Z
 March 3: J Wave: Happiness

Magazines
 February 28: MacPeople
 March 12: Frau
 March 28: Vogue Japan

Websites
 February 27: Natalie
 February 27: Excite Women
 February 27: Model Press
 February 28: Model Press
 February 28: Oricon Style
 February 28: Excite

Track listing

CD
 Only One (Japanese Version)
 The Shadow (Japanese version)
 Only One (Instrumental)
 The Shadow (Instrumental)

DVD
 Only One
 The Shadow
 Only One (making)
 The Shadow (making)

Chart performance

Credits 
Credits adapted from album's liner notes.

Studio 
 SM Yellow Tail Studio – recording, mixing, digital editing
 Ingrid Studio – recording
 Studio-T – strings recording
 Sonic Korea – mastering

Personnel 

 SM Entertainment – executive producer
 Lee Soo-man – producer
 BoA – vocals, background vocals, producer, lyrics, composition
 Tesung Kim – arrangement, vocal directing
 Kim Yong-shin – arrangement, strings conducting and arrangement
 Yong – strings performing
 Gu Jong-pil – recording, mixing, digital editing
 Jung Eui-seok – recording
 Jung Eun-kyung – recording
 Oh Seong-geun – strings recording
 Song Joo-yong – assistant strings recording
 Jeon Hoon – mastering

References

BoA songs
2013 singles
Pop ballads
2013 songs